Fr. Lester John Thomas Costello (February 16, 1928 – December 10, 2002) was a Canadian ice hockey player and Catholic priest.

He was born in South Porcupine, Ontario, a neighbourhood of Timmins, and played hockey as a teenager, eventually joining Toronto's St. Michael's Majors in the 1940s, winning the Memorial Cup twice with the team in 1945 and 1947. He subsequently played two years in the National Hockey League for the Toronto Maple Leafs, including the 1948 Stanley Cup championship team. His brother Murray was also a professional hockey player.

Costello retired from professional hockey in 1950 to pursue seminary studies at St. Augustine's Seminary, and was ordained in 1957. After serving briefly in Kirkland Lake, he took a parish in his hometown of Timmins, where he was widely respected for both his flamboyant, fun-loving demeanor and his tireless commitment to social justice and charity work.

Flying Fathers
In 1963, Costello and colleague Brian McKee founded the Flying Fathers, a group of Catholic priests who played exhibition hockey. Originally intended as a one-time charity event, the Fathers became a phenomenon, regularly touring North America to raise money for charity, and were still active as of 2005.

In 1979, Costello got lost for over 24 hours on a camping trip, and subsequently had several toes amputated due to frostbite. Although his skating ability was significantly impaired by his disability, he continued his involvement with the team, stuffing rolled-up socks into the toes of his skates. Costello began referring to his remaining three toes as "The Father, the Son and the Holy Ghost". The incident also attracted international media attention, including coverage in People magazine and on the television show Real People.

As a result of the media coverage, Francis Ford Coppola offered the Fathers a movie option. He brought Wayne Gretzky to Hollywood to audition for the role of Costello, but the film fell apart when Gretzky's acting ability proved unable to carry a film. (However, it was on that trip that Gretzky first met his future wife, Janet Jones.)

For the 25th anniversary of Costello's ordination in 1982, friends and parishioners took up a collection to buy Costello a truck for use in his charity work. Instead, Costello sold the vehicle and used the money to buy furniture and food for needy families.

Death
At a Flying Fathers game in Kincardine in 2002, Costello had a puck get stuck in his skates, making him fall backwards and hit his head on the ice. Still feeling unwell the following day, he was admitted to hospital, where he slipped into a coma and died a week later on December 10.

As his parish was unable to accommodate the crowds expected for his funeral, the service was held in Timmins' McIntyre Arena. Thousands from all over the country were reputed to have been at the funeral. Timmins native Shania Twain issued a statement of tribute to Costello:

Writer and politician Charlie Angus published a biography of Costello, Les Costello: Canada's Flying Father, in 2005. A foundation to raise funds for food banks, homeless shelters and other anti-poverty charities in Northern Ontario was also launched in Costello's memory the same year. As well, a major street in the city's Schumacher neighbourhood was renamed Father Costello Drive.  The hockey arena in the town of Cobalt, Ontario is named for Father Costello. Costello was posthumously inducted into the Timmins Sports Heritage Hall of Fame in 2014.

Career statistics

Regular season and playoffs

References

External links
 
 Flying Fathers
 "Schumacher's saint: Fr. Les Costello" by Charlie Angus in Catholic New Times
 Les Costello profile at the Catholic Educator's Resource Center
 Picture of Les Costello's Name on the 1948 Stanley Cup Plaque

1928 births
2002 deaths
Canadian ice hockey left wingers
20th-century Canadian Roman Catholic priests
Ice hockey people from Ontario
Pittsburgh Hornets players
Sportspeople from Timmins
Stanley Cup champions
Toronto Maple Leafs players
Toronto St. Michael's Majors players